Iolaus manasei is a butterfly in the family Lycaenidae. It is found in Cameroon.

References

Butterflies described in 1993
Iolaus (butterfly)
Endemic fauna of Cameroon
Butterflies of Africa